Louis R. Tobacco (born May 16, 1972) is an American politician from New York. A Republican, he represented Staten Island's 62nd District as a Member of the New York State Assembly from 2007 through 2012.

Early life, education, and career
Born in Staten Island, Tobacco attended Public School 35, St. Joseph Hill Academy Grammar School, and Monsignor Farrell High School, from which he graduated in 1990. He became an Eagle Scout in 1987.

He graduated from the Rockefeller College of Politics at State University of New York at Albany; while a student, he was an intern for State Assemblyman Robert Straniere and Congressman Guy Molinari as well as a summer intern for Molinari when he later served as Staten Island Borough president. In 1994, he was appointed by the borough president to serve as assistant director of contract oversight. He also represented Staten Island on the Mayor's Health and Human Services Planning Council, and was director of community relations from 1996 to 1997.

After leaving Borough Hall, he worked part-time until 2010 as a pharmaceutical sales representative, for Novartis and then for Pfizer.

After his retirement from the New York State Assembly in 2012, Tobacco worked for Staten Island University Hospital as director of surgical business development and later as associate executive director of community and government affairs. In 2019, he was appointed president and CEO of Monsignor Farrell High School.

Political career
Tobacco's first run for political office was in 1996 for Staten Island's Mid-Island Assembly seat held by Assemblyman Eric Vitaliano. He was unsuccessful that year.

Tobacco was elected to represent the 62nd District in the New York State Assembly in a special election on March 27, 2007 to replace Vincent Ignizio, who resigned his seat to become a New York City Councilmember. He and fellow Staten Islander Nicole Malliotakis were the only Republicans in New York City's State Assembly delegation.

Tobacco served as the Ranking Minority Member  of the Health Committee. He also served on the Ways and Means, Transportation, Cities, Codes, and Corporations, Authorities and Commissions committees. He was tapped to serve as vice chair of the Assembly Minority Sex Offender Watch Task Force and was appointed to the MTA Capital Program Review Board. He was known for his "Tobacco against tobacco" anti-smoking campaign as well as for criticizing the rising toll on the Verrazano-Narrows Bridge and cuts to the mass transit budget for services to Staten Island residents; in winter 2009, he distributed thousands of "No Taxation Without Transportation" bumper stickers.

He retired from the Assembly in 2012 after serving three terms.

Personal life
Lou Tobacco lives in the Tottenville section of Staten Island; he and his wife, Jennifer, have four children.

Election results
 March 2007 special election, NYS Assembly, 62nd AD
{| class="Wikitable"
| Louis Tobacco (REP - ALBANY REFORM) || ... || 2,409
|-
| John S. Mulia (DEM - IND - CON) || ... || 1,008
|}

 November 2008 general election, NYS Assembly, 62nd AD
{| class="Wikitable"
| Lou Tobacco (REP - IND - CON) || ... || 30,410
|-
| Albert J. Albanese (DEM) || ... || 11,816
|}

 November 2010 general election, NYS Assembly, 62nd AD
{| class="Wikitable"
| Lou Tobacco (REP - IND - CON) || ... || 22,856
|-
| Albert J. Albanese (DEM) || ... || 6,179
|}

References

External links
 New York State Assembly: Louis Tobacco

1972 births
Living people
American people of Italian descent
Politicians from New York City
Republican Party members of the New York State Assembly
People from Tottenville, Staten Island
University at Albany, SUNY alumni
21st-century American politicians
Monsignor Farrell High School alumni